Kindred is a rural locality in the local government area of Central Coast, in the North West region of Tasmania. The 2016 census determined a population of 234 for the state suburb of Kindred.

History
The area was originally known as Kindred Plains. It was so named because so many settlers became related through marriage. The locality was gazetted in 1962.

Geography
The Wilmot River forms the south-eastern and part of the eastern boundaries.

Road infrastructure
The B16 route (Kindred Road) enters from the north and runs south through the village of Kindred before turning west and exiting. Route C132 (Wilmot Road) enters from the north mid-way along the eastern boundary and runs generally south and west, following the Wilmot River, before exiting to the south. Route C144 (Paloona Road) starts at an intersection with C132 and exits to the east.

References

Localities of Central Coast Council (Tasmania)
Towns in Tasmania